Lambertus Neher (13 September 1889, Amsterdam – 22 August 1967, Voorst) was a Dutch politician and businessman.

For his active role in the Dutch resistance in World War II, he received an American honour, the Medal of Freedom with Gold Palm, on April 9, 1953.

References
  Biography in the Biografisch Woordenboek van Nederland
  Parlement.com biography

1889 births
1967 deaths
Businesspeople from Amsterdam
Dutch chief executives
Dutch resistance members
Ministers of Housing and Spatial Planning of the Netherlands
Recipients of the Medal of Freedom
Articles containing video clips